Maggie Lavender is a Scottish continuity announcer, best known for her work on STV.

Broadcasting career
She began her career at Glasgow International Airport, providing Flightwatch morning reports for the Independent Local Radio stations, Radio Clyde and Radio Forth.

Maggie later joined Scottish Television as an out-of-vision announcer. By 1998, her duties were expanded when presentation for Grampian Television was moved to Scottish's studios in Cowcaddens, Glasgow.

She was the senior announcer for the station, provided live announcements during primetime, pre-recorded announcements overnight and during daytime and voiced various trails and promos. She is also a trained actress.

By much request, Lavender was interviewed on-screen on 25 July 2007 on STV's website as part of the popular video blog, The Real MacKay.

In late 2019, Maggie left STV after over 30 years of service. She remains one of the longest serving continuity announcers on the ITV network.

References

Living people
Radio and television announcers
Year of birth missing (living people)